Tencent Holdings Ltd. is a Chinese multinational technology and entertainment conglomerate and holding company headquartered in Shenzhen. It is one of the highest grossing multimedia companies in the world based on revenue. It is also the world’s largest company in the video game industry based on its investments, with Tencent Games being the subdivision of Tencent Interactive Entertainment Group (IEG) focused on publishing of games.

Founded in 1998, its subsidiaries globally market various Internet-related services and products, including in entertainment, artificial intelligence, and other technology. Its twin-skyscraper headquarters, Tencent Seafront Towers (also known as Tencent Binhai Mansion) are based in the Nanshan District of Shenzhen.

Tencent is the world's largest video game vendor, as well as one of the most financially valuable companies. It is among the largest social media, venture capital, and investment corporations. Its services include social networks, music, web portals, e-commerce, mobile games, internet services, payment systems, smartphones, and multiplayer online games. It operates the instant messengers Tencent QQ and WeChat, and QQ.com. It also owns Tencent Music.

The company surpassed a market value of US$500 billion in 2018, becoming the first Asian technology company to cross this valuation mark. It has since then emerged as the most valuable publicly traded company in China, and is the world's tenth most valuable company by market value as of February 2022. In 2015, 2018, and 2020, the company was ranked by the Boston Consulting Group and Fast Company among the 50 most innovative companies worldwide. Tencent has stakes in over 600 companies, and began focusing on tech start-ups in Asia in 2017. TechCrunch characterized Tencent's investment strategy as letting its portfolio startups operate autonomously. Tencent's valuation approached US$1 trillion in January 2021 before it plummeted. In September 2022, Tencent bought back $2.3B worth of stock.

History

1998–2010: Founding and growth 
Tencent was founded by Pony Ma, Zhang Zhidong, Xu Chenye, Charles Chen and Zeng Liqing in November 1998 as Tencent Inc, incorporated in the Cayman Islands. The name "Tencent" is based on its Chinese name Tengxun, which incorporates part of Pony Ma's Chinese name (Ma Huateng; 马化「腾」) and literally means "galloping fast information". Initial funding was provided to it by venture capitalists. In February 1999, Tencent's messenger product OICQ was released. Shortly after, Tencent had the client's name changed to QQ; this was said to be due to a lawsuit threat from ICQ and its owner AOL. The company remained unprofitable for the first three years.

South African media company Naspers purchased a 46.5% share of Tencent in 2001. As of 2021, it owns 30.86% through Prosus, which also owns a stake in Tencent's sister companies, such as OLX, VK, Trip.com Group, Delivery Hero, Bykea, Meesho, Stack Overflow, Udemy, Codecademy, Brainly and PayU. Tencent Holding Ltd was listed on the Hong Kong Stock Exchange on 16 June 2004, and it was added as a Hang Seng Index Constituent Stock in 2008.

The company originally derived income solely from advertising and premium users of QQ, who pay monthly fees to receive extras. By 2005, charging for use of QQ mobile, its cellular value-added service, and licensing its penguin character, which could be found on snack food and clothing, had also become income generators. By 2008, Tencent was seeing profit growth from the sale of virtual goods.

While Tencent's services have included online gaming since 2004, around 2007/2008 it rapidly increased its offerings by licensing games. While at least two, Crossfire and Dungeon Fighter Online, were originally produced by South Korean game developers, Tencent now makes its own games. On 21 January 2011, Tencent launched Weixin, a social media app. Now branded as WeChat, the app is one of the "super apps", due to its wide range of functions and platforms, and its over 1 billion monthly active users.

2011–2014: Early investments 
On 18 February 2011, Tencent acquired a majority of equity interest (92.78%) in Riot Games, developer of League of Legends, for about US$230 million. Tencent had already held 22.34% of the equity interest out of a previous investment in 2008. On 16 December 2015, Riot Games sold its remaining equity to Tencent. Tencent acquired a minority stake in Epic Games, developer of franchises like Fortnite, Unreal, Gears of War and Infinity Blade, in June 2012. That year, Tencent acquired ZAM Network, parent of Wowhead and other websites, from Brock Pierce.

Tencent in 2013 increased its stake in Kingsoft Network Technology, a subsidiary of Kingsoft Corporation, to 18%. Tencent previously had a 15.68% stake in the company and raised the stake through a US$46.98 million investment. Tencent took part in Activision Blizzard splitting from Vivendi as a passive investor in 2013 and now owns less than 4.9% of the shares as of 2017. On 17 September 2013, it was announced that Tencent had invested $448 million for a minority share in Chinese search engine Sogou.com, the subsidiary of Sohu, Inc.

On 15 January 2014, Tencent said it would invest HKD 1.5 billion (US$193.45 million) in logistics and warehouse firm China South City Holdings Ltd to develop its e-commerce and logistics business. On 27 February 2014, Tencent purchased a 20-percent stake in restaurant ratings and group-buying website Dianping for $400 million. On 10 March 2014, Tencent bought a 15 percent stake in Chinese e-commerce website JD.com Inc. by paying cash and handing over its e-commerce businesses Paipai, QQ Wanggou and a stake in Yixun to JD.com to build a stronger competitor to Alibaba Group.

On 22 May 2014, JD.com got listed on NASDAQ and Tencent expanded its stake in the company to 17.43% on a fully diluted basis by investing an additional US$1,325 million. On 27 March 2014, it was announced that Tencent had agreed to pay about $500 million for a 28 percent stake in South Korea's CJ Games. On 27 June 2014, Tencent announced that it had agreed to buy a 19.9 percent stake in Chinese e-commerce website 58.com (WUBA) Inc. for $736 million. On 17 April 2015, Tencent announced it bought an additional $400 million worth of shares, rising its stake in the company to about 25%. On 16 October 2014, via its wholly held subsidiary Hongze Lake Investment Ltd, Tencent announced that it had bought a 7% stake in lottery technology firm China LotSynergy Holdings Ltd for HKD 445.5 million (US$57.4 million).

On 23 October 2014, Tencent pitched in $145 million for a 10 percent stake in Koudai Gouwu, a Chinese mobile shopping portal. In November 2014, the company announced a deal with HBO which would give it exclusive rights for distribution in China. On 9 December 2014, Chinese taxi-hailing app Didi Dache announced that it had raised more than $700 million in a funding round led by Tencent and Singaporean state investment firm Temasek Holdings.

2015–2020: Continued investments 

In January 2015, Tencent launched WeBank (China), China's first online-only bank. On 30 January 2015, Tencent announced that it had signed a US$700 million deal with the National Basketball Association to stream American basketball games in China. Later that year, Chinese automaker BYD became the chief corporate sponsor for Tencent's NBA broadcasts. On 21 June 2016 Tencent announced a deal to acquire 84.3% of Supercell, developer of Clash of Clans, with US$8.6 billion. In July 2016, Tencent acquired a majority stake in China Music Corporation.

In 2016, Tencent, together with Foxconn and luxury-car dealer Harmony New Energy Auto founded Future Mobility, a car startup (now defunct) that aimed to sell all-electric fully autonomous premium cars. On 28 March 2017, Tesla, Inc. announced Tencent had purchased a 5% stake in Tesla for US$1.78 billion, the automotive control systems of which it subsequently successfully performed penetration-testing until 2019.

In a "direct challenge to Chinese search engine Baidu," in May 2017, Tencent entered news feed and search functions for its WeChat app, which the Financial Times reported was used by 770 million people at the time.

In May 2017, Tencent surpassed Wells Fargo to enter the world's top 10 most valuable companies. Tencent has also entered an agreement with the Wuhu City Council to build the world's first eSports town in the city, which comprises an eSports theme park, eSports university, a cultural and creative park, an animation industrial park, creative block, tech entrepreneurial community and Tencent Cloud's data center. The site will be used for the education and accommodation of future eSports players, as well as hosting national eSports events and serving as a hub for Tencent's game development. Aside from Wuhu, another eSports theme park is planned in Chengdu.

In June 2017, Tencent became the 8th most valuable company in BrandZ's Top 100 Most Valuable Global Brands, signalling its growing influence globally as well as the rise of Chinese brands. Alibaba overtook Tencent as Asia's most valuable company as its stocks surged after the company hosted its 2017 Investor's day. The company has also developed its own voice assistant Xiaowei, and was in the midst of discussion to acquire Rovio Entertainment, the developer of Angry Birds. At the same time, Tencent introduced its mini-programs feature that allows smartphone users to access mobile apps across the globe on WeChat without downloading them.

In July 2017, Tencent bought a 9% share in Frontier Developments, the creator of the Elite: Dangerous and Planet Coaster franchises; as well as developer for Rollercoaster Tycoon 2 & 3. In August 2017, after Tencent announced the second quarter 2016 financial report, the stock price rose by 6.2% in the Hong Kong stock market, and the market value reached US$429 billion. Tencent became the second Asian company after Alibaba Group to surpass US$400 billion market cap. Tencent has also created an alliance to its own AI self-driving program, similar to Baidu's Apollo Project, recruiting numerous industry players in the automotive industry. It is also collaborating with L'Oréal, the world's largest cosmetics company, to explore digital marketing under the Joint Business Partnership (JBP) agreement.

In November 2017, Tencent revealed that it had purchased a 12% stake in Snap Inc. in the open market, with plans to help establish Snapchat as a gaming platform. Tencent remained the largest video game publisher in the world by revenue, and had a market capitalisation of around $475 billion. In the same month, Tencent announced that WeChat reached 980 million monthly active users, and said to be earmarking billions of dollars to amass a catalogue of user-generated content, in competition with YouTube. The company became the first Asian company to cross US$500 billion valuation, surpassing Facebook to enter the top 5 list of the world's biggest firms.

In January 2018, Tencent and The Lego Group, the world's largest toy company, teamed up to jointly develop online games and potentially a social network aimed at children. It also launched its first unmanned shop in Shanghai. Tencent led a US$5.2 billion investment in Wanda Commercial, together with JD.com, Sunac and Suning Group, to acquire shares in the conglomerate. Wanda Commercial was renamed Wanda Commercial Management Group. Tencent bought a 5% to 10% minority stake in Skydance Media. On 23 January 2018, Tencent and Carrefour reached strategic co-operation agreement in China.

On 15 August 2018, Tencent reported a profit decline in the second quarter of 2018, ending a growth streak of more than a decade, as investment gains slid and the government's scrutiny of the gaming business weighed on the company. Shares of Tencent fell 3% in morning trade in Hong Kong after the rare drop in quarterly profit was reported, extending a slide that has wiped nearly $50 billion in market value from the company in that week. The sell-off dragged down many other Chinese internet stocks as well.

On 6 September 2018, Luckin Coffee signed a strategic cooperation agreement with Tencent.

In October 2019, Tencent began sending out refunds to customers after cancelling the broadcast of NBA games in response to the Houston Rockets general manager Daryl Morey's social media comments in support of protests in Hong Kong.

On 29 June 2020, Tencent acquired the video-on-demand service iflix in Kuala Lumpur, Malaysia.

In September 2020, Tencent picked Singapore as its hub in Asia, joining rivals ByteDance and Alibaba in the race to reinforce their presence closer to home after complications in India and the United States.

2021–present: Regulatory scrutiny 
In July 2021, China's antitrust regulator formally blocked Tencent's plan to merge China's top two video game streaming sites, Huya Live and DouYu, after it had failed to come up with sufficient remedies to meet the SAMR's requirements on giving up exclusive rights. This comes after the company recently withdrew the merger application for antitrust review and refiled it after SAMR told the company it could not complete the review of the merger within 180 days since its first filing. Tencent's plan to take search engine Sogou private was approved by the SAMR. Tencent later announced too its intention to take DouYu private, in part due to the unsuccessful merger, but also due to lacklustre business performance and disagreements over strategy among company executives. Tencent is currently the largest stakeholder in DouYu with a 37% stake.

On 17 December 2021, Tencent announced it had acquired Slamfire Inc. and its subsidiary Turtle Rock Studios, the developer behind Left 4 Dead and Back 4 Blood.

In January 2022, reports emerged that Tencent was one of the major tech conglomerates to receive a fine from the SAMR for failing to report their merger and acquisition (M&A) deals in advance. According to China's antitrust law, official approval is required before the completion of a M&A deal if the combined annual revenue of all entities involved is at least RMB 10 billion (US$1.57 billion), and at least two entities have at least RMB 400 million (US$62.7 million) in annual revenue. Of the 13 deals cited in total by the SAMR, each carried a fine of RMB 500,000 (US$78,700) and Tencent received a total fine of RMB 4.5 million (US$710,000) for its involvement in nine deals.

On 11 January 2022, it was announced that Tencent was in talks to acquire Xiaomi-backed Black Shark, one of the largest gaming smartphone makers in China. The acquisition would have been Tencent's first in a hardware maker and would have overseen Black Shark's transition into a manufacturer of VR headsets to support Tencent's plans for its metaverse business in the future. Reports initially suggested that Black Shark would be acquired for RMB 2.7 billion (US$420 million), although Tencent walked away from the deal due to regulatory scrutiny of metaverse businesses in China.

In June 2022, Tencent posted its slowest revenue gain since going public in 2004, partly caused by a 15% decrease in advertising revenue. The decline was attributed to the pandemic and tighter regulations imposed by the Chinese government.

In September 2022, Tencent acquired a 49.9% stake and 5% voting rights in Guillemot Brothers Limited, Ubisoft's parent company.

On 16 September 2022, Tencent took a minority stake in Mordhau studio Triternion.

In November 2022, Tencent announced that it would divest the majority of its US$20.3 billion stake in Meituan through a dividend distribution to shareholders, in part due to China's earlier regulatory crackdown on tech giants.

In January 2023, OpenSecrets reported that Tencent spent over $6.3 million lobbying the U.S. federal government after coming under greater regulatory scrutiny in 2020.

Products and services

Social media 
Launched in February 1999, Tencent QQ is Tencent's first and most notable product, QQ is one of the most popular instant messaging platforms in its home market. As of 31 December 2010, there were 647.6 million active Tencent QQ IM user accounts, making Tencent QQ the world's largest online community at the time. The number of QQ accounts connected simultaneously has, at times, exceeded 100 million. While the IM service itself is free, a fee was being charged for mobile messaging as of 2006. Tencent also created QQ International, which is an English version of QQ that allows communication with mainland accounts, QQi is available for Windows and macOS. In 2005, Tencent launched Qzone, a social networking/blogging service integrated within QQ. Qzone has become one of the largest social networking services in China, with a user base of 645 million in 2014.

On 10 April 2010, Tencent launched Tencent Weibo, a microblogging service.

WeChat is a mobile app with voice- and text messaging and a timeline. It is the most popular social mobile application in China and some overseas Chinese communities, for instance, Malaysia. As of 2017, WeChat has been unsuccessful in penetrating major international markets outside of China.

Entertainment

Video games 

Tencent publishes video games via its Tencent Games division of Tencent Interactive Entertainment and holds many investments in domestic and, since the 2010s, foreign game companies. It has five internal studio groups, TiMi Studio Group, Lightspeed Studios, Aurora Studio Group, Morefun Studio and Next Studio.

Foreign investments

Former foreign stakes 
 Tencent had a 14.46% stake in Glu Mobile before Glu sold itself to Electronic Arts.
 Tencent had invested in Playdots, which was acquired by Take-Two Interactive in August 2020.
 Tencent invested in Activision Blizzard as a minority investor with 5% in 2013, when the holding company bought itself from the Vivendi conglomerate which was part of it since 2008. In 2022, Activision Blizzard was sold to Microsoft and so were the minority shares that Tencent owned for almost 10 years.
 Tencent's Sumo Group subsidiary wholly owned Pipeworks Studios until it was sold to Jagex for an undisclosed sum in July 2022.

Domestic investments 
 20% ownership of Chinese company Wangyuan Shengtang, which publishes, among others, the Gujian franchise.
 18.6% ownership of Chinese company iDreamSky, which mainly develops and publishes mobile games for the Chinese market.
 5% ownership of Chinese company Century Huatong, which operates games developed by FunPlus. Tencent became a shareholder through an investment in Century Huatong's subsidiary Shengqu Games.
 5% ownership of Chinese company Game Science, responsible for the development of Black Myth: Wukong.

Television and cinema 

In April 2009, Tencent launched iTQQ, a "smart interactive television service" in a joint effort with TCL.

In 2015, Tencent launched Tencent Pictures, a film distributor and a production company that creates and distributes films based on books, comic books, animated series and video games. In the same year, Tencent launched Tencent Penguin Pictures a production unit focusing on online dramas and minor investments in feature films. It is under the Online Media Business Unit at Tencent and works closely with Tencent Video.

Comics 
On 21 March 2012, Tencent launched Tencent Comic, and would later become China's largest online animation platform.

In September 2017, Tencent has announced plans to introduce Chinese online comics to every market around the world, with the first being North America. It will be working with San Francisco-based digital publisher Tapas Media, a partnership that will see English-language releases of several popular online Chinese titles.

Music 

In 2014, Tencent established exclusive in-China distribution agreements with several large music producers, including Sony, Warner Music Group and YG Entertainment and in 2017 it signed a deal with Universal Music Group to stream its music in China. It also entered a partnership with Alibaba Group on music-streaming rights sharing, the deal aims to protect licensed streaming services offering copyrighted content of the music industry, encouraging more high-quality and original music, as well as developing China's fast-growing streaming market. Alibaba will gain the rights to stream music from international labels, which already have exclusive deals with Tencent, in return for offering reciprocal rights to its catalogue of Chinese and Japanese music.

In December 2017, Tencent's music arm, Tencent Music Entertainment (TME) and Spotify agreed to swap 10% stake and invested in each other's music businesses, forming an alliance in the music industry in which Martin Lau (president of Tencent) described it as a "strategic collaboration".

In October 2019, Tencent Music reached a streaming music distribution agreement with CD Baby and TuneCore to provide Independent Music Artists who distribute music through CD Baby and TuneCore access to the Chinese music market through Tencent's music streaming services QQ Music, KuGou, and Kuwo.

In March 2020, Tencent acquired 10% of Vivendi's stake in Universal Music Group, world's largest music group. In addition, it was given the option to buy another 10% with the same condition.

In June 2020, Tencent bought 1.6% of Warner Music Group's shares after WMG launched its IPO in the same month.

Video streaming 

In June 2011, Tencent launched Tencent Video, a video streaming website. It also controls the live-streaming platform Huya Live and has stakes in other major Chinese game live-streaming platform operators, including DouYu, Kuaishou and Bilibili. In March 2020, Tencent started testing Trovo Live, a live-streaming service for worldwide users. Since June 2020, it owns the Malaysian Video-on-demand service Iflix.

Virtual reality 
In late April 2017, Tencent announced it was preparing to launch its virtual reality headset that year.

In December 2022, Jia Wang, Deputy Director of the Technology Service Center at Tencent's office in Palo Alto, California, spoke with WIPO Magazine about the impact of technologies such as augmented reality, virtual reality, and artificial intelligence on the industry, highlighting the importance of Intellectual Property protection in order to ensure that developers are able to make a return on their investments and continue to innovate.

E-commerce 
In September 2005, Tencent launched PaiPai.com, a C2C auction site. In addition to PaiPai.com, Tencent launched TenPay, an online payment system similar to PayPal, which supports B2B, B2C, and C2C payments.

In response to the dominance of the Chinese e-commerce market by Tencent competitor Alibaba Group, Tencent took great effort in its e-commerce platforms. On 10 March 2014, Tencent bought a 15 percent stake in Chinese e-commerce website JD.com Inc. by paying cash and handing over its e-commerce businesses Paipai.com, QQ Wanggou, and a stake in Yixun to JD.com, as well as purchasing a stake in e-commerce website 58 Tongcheng. In accordance to this agreement, JD.com would receive exclusive access to Tencent's WeChat and MobileQQ platforms. In May 2014, JD became the first Chinese e-commerce company to be listed on the NASDAQ exchange, under its ticker 'JD'.

On 31 December 2015, JD announced that they will stop supporting services on Paipai.com after being unable to deal with issues involving fake goods, and had integrated the Paipai.com team within its other e-commerce platforms. In a 3-month transitional period, Paipai.com would be fully shut down by 1 April 2016. JD relaunched PaiPai.com as PaiPai Second Hand to compete alongside 58 Tongcheng's Zhuanzhuan.com, both partially owned by Tencent, against Alibaba's Xianyu in the second-hand e-commerce market.

Tencent was reported in 2017 to be working with China's Central Bank to develop a central payments clearing platform for online payments.

On 31 December 2021, it was reported Tencent had bought a stake in the UK digital bank, Monzo.

Utility software 
In March 2006, Tencent launched its search engine Soso.com (搜搜; to search). On 1 October 2012, it was the 33rd most visited website in the world, 11th most visited in China, as well as the 8th most visited website in South Korea, according to Alexa Internet. It was also a Chinese partner of Google, using AdWords. In September 2013, Tencent discontinued Soso.com after it invested in Sogou and replaced Soso.com with Sogou Search as its main search engine.

In 2008, Tencent released a media player, available for free download, under the name QQ Player. Tencent also launched Tencent Traveler, a web browser based on Trident. It became the third most-visited browser in China in 2008.

QQ Haiwai is Tencent's first venture into international real estate listings and information and is the result of a partnership with Chinese international real estate website Juwai.com. Haiwai was announced at Tencent's annual regional summit in Beijing on 21 December 2016.

In 2017, Tencent launched its own credit score system called Tencent Credit, with a process similar to that of Sesame Credit, operated by its competitor, the Alibaba Group, through its subsidiary Ant Financial.

Healthcare and insurance 
Tencent has created WeChat Intelligent Healthcare, Tencent Doctorwork, and AI Medical Innovation System (AIMIS) Tencent Doctorwork has also merged with Trusted Doctors

Tencent officially commences operations of its first insurance agency platform, WeSure Internet Insurance Ltd. (WeSure), to work with domestic insurance companies such as Ping An Insurance.

In August 2017, Tencent released AI Medical Innovation System (AIMIS) or Miying (觅影 in Chinese), which has two core competencies: AI medical imaging and AI-assisted diagnosis. AI Medical Innovation System (AIMIS) is capable of helping doctors screen for several diseases such as diabetic retinopathy, lung cancer and esophageal cancer through its AI-assisted medical image analysis. Its AI-assisted medical diagnosis engine allows doctors to identify and estimate the risk of more than 700 diseases, improving the accuracy and efficiency of their diagnosis. The system is undergoing clinical validation in more than 100 major Chinese hospitals. It has already helped doctors read more than 100 million medical images and served nearly one million patients. Tencent's data shows that recognition accuracy reaches 90% for esophageal cancer, 97% for diabetic retinopathy and 97.2% for colorectal cancer. In general, Chinese medical institutions and companies are taking a proactive attitude toward AI. Nearly 80% of hospitals and medical enterprises plan to carry out, or have already carried out, medical AI applications, and more than 75% of hospitals believe that these applications will become popular in the future.

During the COVID-19 pandemic, Tencent helped source 1.2 million protective masks for American medical staff combating the virus.

Data processing 
On 27 March 2020, a co-innovation lab was launched by Tencent who will be in collaborations with Huawei in developing a cloud-based game platform by tapping into Huawei's Kunpeng processor's power to build Tencent's GameMatrix cloud game platform. Along with further exploration in the possibilities of artificial intelligence and augmented reality elements in game.

In October 2020, Tencent's AIMIS Image Cloud was introduced. AIMIS Image Cloud was designed to help patients manage their medical images and give permission to medical professionals to access their exams and reports. The AIMIS platform supports full images on the cloud to reduce repeated exams. It can also connect medical institutions at all levels through cloud based Picture Archiving and Communication Systems (PACS), allowing patients to take examinations in primary medical institutions and obtain expert diagnosis remotely. Doctors can conduct online consultations through Tencent real-time audio and video facilities when they encounter difficult cases and work collaboratively on images to communicate more efficiently.

On 26 May 2020, Tencent announced it planned to invest 500 billion yuan (US$70 billion) over the next five years in new digital infrastructure, a major hi-tech initiative that would bolster Beijing's efforts to drive economic recovery in the post-coronavirus era.

Other 
In June 2020, Tencent has unveiled plans for an urban development dubbed "Net City", a 21-million-square-foot development, equivalent in size to Monaco, in Shenzhen. It will prioritize pedestrians, green spaces and self-driving vehicles. It will include corporate offices, a school, apartments, sports facilities, parks and retail space, according to the project's architect, NBBJ.

At the end of June 2020, Tencent has increased its direct stake in Nio to 15.1% after acquiring more of the Chinese electric vehicle maker's New York-listed shares recently. Tencent spent $10 million to buy 1.68 million American Depositary Shares earlier in the month, according to Nio's latest filing with the U.S. Securities and Exchange Commission. The Shenzhen-based social media and entertainment conglomerate also controls another 16% stake in Nio's ADSs through three of its units.
Tencent was the second-largest Nio shareholder in terms of voting rights after Li Bin, founder of the automaker, who held 13.8% in shares but 47% voting rights, according to a March filing by the company.
As of 8 July, they bought another amount of shares increasing their stake in Nio to 16.3%.

Corporate governance 

Tencent's largest shareholder is Prosus (majority owned by Naspers), which owns 30.86% of all shares and hence is the controlling shareholder. However, Ma Huateng, co-founder of Tencent, still owns a significant stake (8.42%).

Tencent's headquarters is currently the Tencent Binhai Mansion, also known as the Tencent Seafront Towers, which is located in Shenzhen's Nanshan District. In addition to its headquarters in Shenzhen, Tencent also has offices in Beijing, Shanghai, Chengdu, and Guangzhou.

Tencent has a unitary board consisting of Tencent co-founder, CEO, and chairman Ma Huateng, also known as Pony Ma, executive director and President of Tencent Martin Lau, non-executive directors Jacobus "Koos" Bekker and Charles Searle of Naspers, and independent non-executive directors Li Dongsheng, Iain Bruce, Ian Stone, and Yang Siushun. Tencent's governance is aided by its Strategy Department, commonly known as SD, which provides business analytics for the corporation's various divisions.

Subsidiaries 
Tencent has at least four wholly foreign-owned enterprises and nearly twenty subsidiaries.

Tencent Technology (Shenzhen) Co., Ltd. 
A software development unit that has created, among others, Tencent Traveler and later versions of QQ IM, as well as some mobile software. This subsidiary is located on the Southern District of Hi-Tech Park, Shenzhen. It also holds a number of patents related to instant messaging and massively multiplayer online game gaming.

Research 
In 2007, Tencent invested over RMB100 million in the establishment of the Tencent Research Institute, which became China's first research center dedicated to core Internet technologies. The campuses are located in Beijing, Shanghai, and Shenzhen.

Chinese government partnerships 
For the occasion of the 19th National Congress of the Chinese Communist Party, Tencent released a mobile game titled "Clap for Xi Jinping: An Awesome Speech", in which players have 19 seconds to generate as many claps as possible for the party leader.

In August 2019, it was reported that Tencent collaborated with the Publicity Department of the Chinese Communist Party and the People's Daily to develop "patriotic games."

In a December 2020 article in Foreign Policy, a former senior official of the Central Intelligence Agency stated that the CIA concluded that Tencent received funding from the Ministry of State Security early on in its foundation. This was said to be a "seed investment" that was provided "when they were trying to build out the Great Firewall and the monitoring technology." Tencent denied this allegation.

In 2021, it was reported that Tencent and Ant Group were working with the People's Bank of China to develop a digital currency.

Controversies

Allegations of copying 
Many of Tencent's software and services share similarities to those of competitors, and to their  The founder and chairman, Huateng "Pony" Ma, famously said, "[To] copy is not evil." A former CEO and president of SINA.com, Wang Zhidong, said, "Pony Ma is a notorious king of copying." Jack Ma of Alibaba Group stated, "The problem with Tencent is the lack of innovation; all of their products are copies."

In 1996, an Israeli company named Mirabilis released one of the first stand alone instant messaging clients named ICQ. Three years later, Tencent released a copied version of ICQ, naming it OICQ, which stands for Open ICQ. After losing a lawsuit against AOL, which bought ICQ in 1998, for violating ICQ's intellectual property rights, Tencent released a new version of OICQ in December 2000 and rebranded it QQ. With its model of free-to-use and charging for customizing personal avatars, QQ hit 50 million users in its second year, 856 million users and at most 45.3 million synchronous users in 2008.

During early stages of company development and expansion, Tencent has been widely accused of stealing ideas from its competitors and creating counterfeit copies of their products. Some of the criticisms aimed at Tencent in this regard are that QQ farm was a direct copy of Happy Farm, QQ dance originated from Audition Online, and that QQ speed featured gameplay highly similar to Crazyracing Kartrider. In January 2023, Tencent's trailer for their new MMORPG, Tarisland, was said to resemble Blizzard's World of Warcraft.

Tencent's acquisitions 
In a partial effort to rebuild the reputation of Tencent lost from allegations of copying, Tencent adjusted its strategy by aggressively investing in the acquisition of other companies, rather than in the replication of them. By 2020, Tencent had invested in over 800 companies across the world. During 2012 and 2019, Tencent has invested from minority stakes to majority stakes in world-wide-famous game companies such as Riot Games, Epic Games, Activision Blizzard, SuperCell, and Bluehole. While aggressive acquisitions may benefit Tencent due to factors such as reduction in competition and monopolization, it may not benefit the acquired companies in terms of their growth and innovation. Colin Huang, founder of Pinduoduo, said “Tencent won't die when Pinduoduo dies, because it has tens of thousands of sons.”

Security concerns 
In 2015, security testing firms AV-Comparatives, AV-TEST and Virus Bulletin jointly decided to remove Tencent from their software whitelists. The Tencent products supplied for testing were found to contain optimisations that made the software appear less exploitable when benchmarked but actually provided greater scope for delivering exploits. Additionally, software settings were detrimental to end-users protection if used. Qihoo was later also accused of cheating, while Tencent was accused of actively gaming the anti-malware tests.

Censorship 
Tencent's WeChat platform has been accused of blocking TikTok videos and the censorship of politically sensitive content. In April 2018, TikTok sued Tencent and accused it of spreading false and damaging information on its WeChat platform, demanding RMB 1 million in compensation and an apology. In June 2018, Tencent filed a lawsuit against Toutiao and TikTok in a Beijing court, alleging they had repeatedly defamed Tencent with negative news and damaged its reputation, seeking a nominal sum of RMB 1 in compensation and a public apology. In response, Toutiao filed a complaint the following day against Tencent for allegedly unfair competition and asking for RMB 90 million in economic losses.

However, Tim Sweeney, the CEO and founder of Epic Games, maker of the popular game Fortnite, tweeted that his company would never follow suit and punish people for expressing their opinions, even though Tencent is a 40% stakeholder in Epic. He emphasized, "That will never happen on my watch as the founder, CEO, and controlling shareholder," and that Epic is an American company, implying that it would not compromise an ethos of free speech in the name of currying favor with authorities in China just to try to maximize profit there.

Later, Tencent announced it would stop broadcasting Houston Rockets NBA games in China due to a tweet made by Daryl Morey, general manager of the Houston Rockets, that was supportive of Hong Kong protestors. Although Morey's tweet was hastily deleted, news of it was quickly reported all around the world, and the NBA went on to spend months attempting damage control in China.

In December 2019, the Chinese government ordered Tencent to improve the firm's user data rules for its apps, which regulators regarded to be in violation of censorship rules.

In January 2021, a proposed class action lawsuit was filed in California against Tencent, alleging user censorship and surveillance via WeChat.

In November 2022, Sustainalytics downgraded Tencent to "non-compliant" with the United Nations Global Compact principles due to complicity with censorship.

2020: U.S. executive order on WeChat 
President Donald Trump signed two executive orders on 6 August 2020, one directed at TikTok and one at WeChat. The TikTok order dictated that within 45 days from its signing (20 September 2020) that it would ban transactions involving the TikTok app with ByteDance, effectively banning the TikTok app in the United States, under threat of penalty. TikTok sued Trump over the executive order, the executive order was revoked under the Biden Administration and this caused the lawsuit to be dismissed in July 2021. The order for WeChat contained the same information but targeting the WeChat app and related transactions for Tencent. In the case of ByteDance, the order would be canceled should an American company acquire it, which Microsoft had been openly spoken of, but there are unlikely any immediate buyers for Tencent in the U.S. Los Angeles Times reporter Sam Dean affirmed from the White House that this does not affect other facets of Tencent's ownerships in American companies such as with its video game companies.

See also 

 Foxmail
 Pengyou
 QQ browser
 Qzone
 Sogou
 Tencent Maps

References

External links 

 
 

 
2004 initial public offerings
Chinese brands
Chinese companies established in 1998
Civilian-run enterprises of China
Companies based in Shenzhen
Companies in the Hang Seng Index
Companies listed on the Hong Kong Stock Exchange
Companies' terms of service
Confidence tricks
FTP clients
Holding companies established in 1998
Holding companies of China
Internet properties established in 1998
Investment companies of China
Multinational companies headquartered in China
Nanshan District, Shenzhen
Offshore companies of the Cayman Islands
Online companies of China
RSS
Software companies of China
Video game companies established in 1998
Video game companies of China
Video game development companies
Video game publishers
Web portals
Windows web browsers